The 4th Pan American Junior Athletics Championships were held at Showalter Stadium in Winter Park, Florida, on July 4–6, 1986.

Participation (unofficial)

Detailed result lists can be found on the "World Junior Athletics History" website. An unofficial count yields the number of about 251 athletes from about 25 countries: Antigua and Barbuda (1), Argentina (7), Bahamas (7), Barbados (5), Bermuda (5), Brazil (16), British Virgin Islands (1), Canada (55), Cayman Islands (1), Chile (4), Colombia (4), Costa Rica (1), Cuba (34), Ecuador (2), Grenada (1), Guyana (2), Jamaica (9), Mexico (6), Panama (2), Paraguay (2), Peru (3), Puerto Rico (7), Saint Kitts and Nevis (2), Turks and Caicos Islands (5), United States (69).

Medal summary
Medal winners are published.
Complete results can be found on the "World Junior Athletics History"
website.

Men

Women

Medal table (unofficial)

References

External links
World Junior Athletics History

Pan American U20 Athletics Championships
1986 in American sports
Pan American U20 Championships
International track and field competitions hosted by the United States
Pan American Junior Athletics
1986 in youth sport
Track and field in Florida